Martin Švec (born 26 March 1984) is a Czech football defender who currently plays for FK Fotbal Třinec.

Czech Second League
Švec played in the Czech 2. Liga for Fotbal Fulnek in the 2008-09 season.

Spartak Trnava
In December 2011, he joined Slovak club FC Spartak Trnava on a two-year contract.

References

External links
at fcpetrzalka1898.sk

1984 births
Living people
Czech footballers
Association football defenders
MŠK Púchov players
FC Petržalka players
Slovak Super Liga players
Expatriate footballers in Slovakia
Sportspeople from Ostrava